Aaron Cohen (born 28 February 1976) is an Israeli-American writer, director, actor, author and former Duvdevan Special Forces soldier specializing in counter-terrorism. He wrote the memoir Brotherhood of Warriors.

In 2022 Cohen wrote, directed, and co-starred in the short action war film, Overwatch, a war drama about soldiers deployed overseas struggling to maintain their relationships back home.  The film was officially selected for the 2022 NoHo CineFest Film Festival.

Early life and education
Cohen was born to a Jewish family in Montreal, Quebec. His parents divorced when he was young and the family moved to Miami and settled in Los Angeles. He then spent the next several years shuttling between California, Canada, and Florida. For secondary school he attended the Robert Land Academy, a military academy in Canada, and graduated Beverly Hills High School in 1995.

He is the stepson of the American filmmaker Abby Mann.

Military service
After high school, Cohen moved to Israel and volunteered and was selected to serve in an elite Israel Defense Forces special operations unit.

Post-military 
After his service, Cohen returned to Los Angeles and founded IMS Security Consultants, Inc., a Hollywood VIP protection service that has done security work for Hollywood actors, VIPs, rock stars and dignitaries, as well as providing tactical counter-terrorist and "active shooter" training to vetted members of local, State and Federal law enforcement as well as police SWAT teams and the U.S. military Special Forces.

Film and television
Cohen got his Hollywood start tech advising for numerous films including Steven Soderbergh's Haywire and providing tactical training for actors including Keanu Reeves for the John Wick franchise, and quickly transitioned into acting, supporting in various film and TV projects including 211 with Nicolas Cage, Rambo 5: Last Blood with Sylvester Stallone and a recurring role on the Netflix series Luis Miguel.  Cohen just wrapped filming a strong supporting role in the upcoming crime thriller The Enforcer starring Antonio Banderas expected out summer of 2022

Publications

References

Further reading 
  "Haywire Technical Adviser and Tactical Weapons Trainer To The Actors on With Jeff Shubert" Filmnut.TV, 18 January 2012
 "Exclusive: Director Steven Soderbergh on Haywire" ComingSoon.net, 18 January 2012
 " Haywire Technical Advisor Aaron Cohen on Creating Gun Jitsu" The Wall Street Journal, 17 January 2012
 "Whats Next For Michael Fassbender" Gotchya Movies.com, 17 January 2012
 "Aaron Cohen Former Special Ops Fighter Trains Mixed Martial Arts Champion For Film" Los Angeles Times, 1 January 2012
 "Security Expert Aaron Cohen on Good Day LA" Fox 11 News, 16 September 2011
 "Security Expert Aaron Cohen on Good Day LA" Fox 11 News, 1 July 2011
 "Bodyguard: Aaron Cohen keeps L.A.'s elite out of harm's way. Ask him to take a bullet? That would be missing the point" Los Angeles Magazine, 1 March 2008
 "Paparazzi, Beware! Hollywood Stars Have a Secret Weapon: Israeli Commandos" The Forward, 24 October 2007
 Transcript of "Special Report With Brit Hume, Fox News Interview on air with Aaron Cohen"
 "US Homeland Security Industry Expanding" by Mike O'Sullivan in Voice of America News, 13 September 2006 
 "Cho Seung Hui's Murderous Rampage at Virginia Tech" CNN International, 20 April 2007

External links 
 Cherries Counter-Terror School
 
 KFI Guest Host Aaron Cohen

1976 births
Living people
American emigrants to Israel
Businesspeople from Los Angeles
Businesspeople from Montreal
Canadian emigrants to the United States
Israeli Jews
Israeli soldiers
Israeli writers
Jewish American writers
Jewish Canadian writers
Writers from Los Angeles
Writers from Montreal
21st-century American Jews